Maurice Webster (13 November 1899 – 10 February 1978) was an English footballer, who played as a centre half.

Early and personal life
Webster was born in Blackpool, one of six sons. His step-father was Blackpool player Alec Stuart. Webster married in 1926.

Playing career
Webster played for Blackpool Tramways, Bloomfield Villa, South Shore Wednesday, Fleetwood, Lytham, Blackburn Rovers, Stalybridge Celtic, Middlesbrough and Carlisle United. He retired in early 1936 following a broken leg.

He made three appearances for England in 1930.

Later career
By 1939 Webster was a shopkeeper in Middlesbrough. He also worked as a plumber. He later worked as a trainer at both Middlesbrough and Stockton.

References

1899 births
1978 deaths
Sportspeople from Blackpool
English footballers
England international footballers
Fleetwood Town F.C. players
Lytham F.C. players
Blackburn Rovers F.C. players
Stalybridge Celtic F.C. players
Middlesbrough F.C. players
Carlisle United F.C. players
English Football League players
English Football League representative players
Association football central defenders
Middlesbrough F.C. non-playing staff